Schinia mcfarlandi is a moth of the family Noctuidae. It is found in North America.

References 

Schinia
Moths of North America

Moths described in 2000